Reece Thompson (born 11 November 1993) is an English former semi-professional footballer who played as a striker. He has played in the Football League for York City.

Career

Early career
Born in Worksop, Nottinghamshire, Thompson started his career with Retford United's youth system, before he served his apprenticeship with Lincoln City during a three-year spell. He made one first-team appearance for Lincoln, as a substitute in a 3–1 away defeat to Carshalton Athletic on 18 January 2012 in the FA Trophy. Thompson was released by Lincoln before going on trial with Worksop Town, before he rejoined Retford later in 2012. He broke the record for goals scored in the under-19 league, with 32 goals from 18 appearances. He scored 14 goals from 20 matches with the first team from Christmas to the end of the 2012–13 season. He scored 39 goals in 2013–14.

Thompson joined Northern Premier League Premier Division club Frickley Athletic in October 2014, making his debut as a 90th-minute substitute in a 2–0 home victory over Belper Town on 18 October. His first goals came on 4 November 2015, after scoring twice in a 3–0 win over Stocksbridge Park Steels in the Sheffield & Hallamshire Senior Cup. He signed a contract with the club in November 2014 after scoring four goals from five starts. On 1 May 2015, Thompson scored twice as Frickley beat Nostell Miners Welfare 4–1 in the Sheffield & Hallamshire Senior Cup final, finishing 2014–15 with 15 goals from 32 matches. He was rewarded with a new two-year contract by Frickley.

York City
After a successful trial, Thompson signed for League Two club York City on 3 August 2015 for an undisclosed fee on a two-year contract. He made his debut in the opening match of 2015–16, a 3–0 away defeat to Wycombe Wanderers on 8 August 2015. On 2 September 2016, Thompson left York by mutual consent before joining their National League rivals North Ferriby United.

Return to non-league
Thompson scored 12 goals from 40 appearances for North Ferriby in 2016–17, as they were relegated to the National League North with a bottom-place finish in the National League.

Thompson signed for National League club Guiseley on 26 July 2017, with a fee to be decided by the Football Association unless Guiseley and North Ferriby could agree compensation. On 17 November 2017, he joined National League North club Boston United on loan until 1 January 2018. On 10 April 2019, Thompson's contract with Guiseley was terminated with immediate effect.

Post-prison career
In January 2020, Thompson signed for Mickleover but left the club after being sent back to prison a month later. On 26 August 2020, Thompson played as a trialist in a pre-season friendly for Selby Town, scoring twice against Tadcaster Albion. However, a day later, the club apologised for taking Thompson on trial, saying in a statement: "As a community football club we pride ourselves on being family friendly and as a club we take this very seriously. In this case a serious error of judgement was made and once again, we can only apologise for our mistake and make clear that the player in question will not be joining our squad now or in the future."

Thompson's former manager at Frickley Karl Rose signed him for his new amateur club Wombwell Town in October 2020. The club released a statement a week later stating that Thompson would not play again following the backlash the club had received for registering him.

Prison sentence
On 3 April 2019, Thompson was sentenced to a 40-month custodial sentence along with a ten-year restraining order for domestic violence. He pleaded guilty to damaging property, assault occasioning actual bodily harm and inflicting grievous bodily harm to the victim over a three-day period when he appeared at Nottingham Crown Court.

In February 2020, a month after his release, Thompson was sent back to prison after posting a number of inappropriate tweets in relation to his conviction and because he spoke about the case to The Sun.

Career statistics

Honours
Frickley Athletic
Sheffield & Hallamshire Senior Cup: 2014–15

References

External links

1993 births
Living people
Footballers from Worksop
English footballers
Association football forwards
Retford United F.C. players
Lincoln City F.C. players
Frickley Athletic F.C. players
York City F.C. players
North Ferriby United A.F.C. players
Guiseley A.F.C. players
Boston United F.C. players
Mickleover Sports F.C. players
Northern Premier League players
English Football League players
National League (English football) players
Prisoners and detainees of England and Wales
Sportspeople convicted of crimes
English people convicted of assault